Euryphaedra is a butterfly genus in the family Nymphalidae. It contains only one species, Euryphaedra thauma, which is found in Cameroon and Gabon.

References

Seitz, A. Die Gross-Schmetterlinge der Erde 13: Die Afrikanischen Tagfalter. Plate XIII 50

Limenitidinae
Monotypic butterfly genera
Taxa named by Otto Staudinger
Butterflies described in 1891
Nymphalidae genera